Thomas Weston Segura (born April 16, 1979) is an American stand-up comedian, writer, author, actor, and podcaster. Segura co-hosts the Your Mom's House podcast with his wife and fellow comedian Christina Pazsitzky. Segura also co-hosts the podcast Two Bears One Cave with friend and fellow comedian Bert Kreischer.

Early life 
Segura was born on April 16, 1979 in Cincinnati, Ohio to Rosario "Charo" Segura and Thomas Nadeau Segura. His father was first vice president of Merrill Lynch, the investment and wealth management division of Bank of America .

Tom grew up speaking Spanish and spent his summers in Lima, Peru. He graduated from Saint Edward's School in Vero Beach, Florida, and from Lenoir-Rhyne University in Hickory, North Carolina. At age 19, he overdosed on GHB and fell into a short coma.

Career 
Segura began stand-up comedy shortly after graduating from Lenoir-Rhyne University. On episode 568 of Your Mom's House, Segura mentioned he was doing comedy in the evenings for the first few years while holding down other daytime jobs. Segura has described interning at Kopelson Entertainment and then having his first paid job in the industry as a logger, producing transcripts of reality shows such as Extreme Makeover and My Big Fat Obnoxious Boss.

Segura has performed at the Melbourne International Comedy Festival, The Comedy Festival, the Global Comedy Festival in Vancouver, and Just For Laughs Comedy Festival. Segura was also a San Francisco regional finalist on Last Comic Standing 2.

In 2018, Segura and Pazsitzky landed a TV deal with CBS, who gave a pilot production commitment for their show The Little Things. Segura's fourth special for Netflix, Ball Hog, premiered on March 24, 2020, and a Spanish-language special was planned for the fall of 2020, before the advent of the COVID-19 pandemic.

In 2010, Segura and Pazsitzky started the podcast Your Mom's House, which they both host.

Segura released a book in 2022 titled I'd Like to Play Alone, Please, a collection of humorous essays. He said about the book: "This is not a memoir, this is not an autobiography. It's a collection of stories, which is an extension of what I do as a comedian, which is I tell stories, a lot."

Personal life
Segura is from Cincinnati, Ohio, and has lived in Minneapolis, Minnesota; Mequon, Wisconsin; Vero Beach, Florida; and Los Angeles, California. He has two sisters Jane and Maria and is related to the neurobiologist and podcast host Andrew D. Huberman.

Segura and his wife and two children live in Austin, Texas.

Stand-up comedy

Albums

TV appearances

Bibliography

Filmography

Film

References

External links
 
 Your Mom's House Podcast
 

1979 births
21st-century American comedians
Living people
American male comedians
American stand-up comedians
People from Cincinnati
Hispanic and Latino American writers
American people of Peruvian descent
Comedians from Ohio
American podcasters
People from Vero Beach, Florida